The Sewanee Perimeter Trail is a private mixed-use mountain top trail of  owned and maintained by the University of the South in Sewanee, TN.

Description
The trail follows the perimeter of the Cumberland Plateau bluff line and encircles the campus of the University of the South. It is open for use by students, faculty, and alumni of the University as well as local residents of Sewanee. The trail includes mixed use sections appropriate for hiking, running, and mountain biking as well as sections that are for hiking only.

Designated Trails
It consists of ten designated hiking trails:
 Cross/Perimeter Trail/Tennessee Williams:  loop
 The Cross to Morgan's Steep:  one way
 Bridal Veil Falls:  round trip
 Elliott Point/Parallel Trail:  loop
 Western Section Perimeter:  one way
 Forestry Cabin/Dotson Point:  loop
 Thumping Dick Cove:  round trip
 Cedar Hollow Lake:  loop
 Shakerag/Beckwith's Point:  loop
 Piney Point:  round trip

Access Points
Access points on the trail include the Memorial Cross, Lake Cheston, Green's View, and the University Gates.  At each access point are signs noting the hiking and camping policies of the property. Since the University property is private, all visitors must abide by stated policies.

Notes

Sewanee: The University of the South
Hiking